Irreplaceable Love, is an album by American contemporary gospel music group Commissioned, released on March 1, 1996 via Verity Records. It was the last album with Marvin Sapp.

Domestically, the album peaked at number 3 on the US Billboard Top Gospel albums chart, number 9 on the Billboard Top Contemporary Christian chart and number 19 on the Billboard Top Heatseekers chart.

Track listing
 "Opening Meditation" – 0:40
 "Dominion" – 4:15
 "Breakin' Away" – 4:51
 "Until My Change Comes" – 4:43
 "Do You Still Love Me" – 4:57
 "They Must Know" – 4:34
 "More Than I (Interlude)" – 1:06
 "Irreplaceable Love" – 4:11
 "No Weapon" – 5:25
 "I Can Love Again" – 5:12
 "More Than I" – 5:11
 "Crucified with Christ" – 6:20
 "Closing Meditation" – 0:46

Personnel
Marvin Sapp: vocals
Karl Reid: vocals
Mitchell Jones: vocals, synthesizer
Montrell Darrett: vocals
Maxx Frank: keyboard, organ, Fender Rhodes piano

Additional musicians
Tom Howard: piano
Nathan Maxwell: bass
George Cocchini: guitar
John Catchings, David Davidson, Pamela Sixfin & Kristin Wilkinson: strings
Tim Bowman: acoustic guitar
Tony "Downtown" Brown: bass
Jeff Walker: keyboard
Derrick Buckingham: guitar
Al Turner: bass

References

Commissioned (gospel group) albums
1996 albums